The 1991 Vuelta a Murcia was the seventh edition of the Vuelta a Murcia cycle race and was held on 12 March to 17 March 1991. The race started and finished in Murcia.

General classification

References

1991
March 1991 sports events in Europe
1991 in road cycling
1991 in Spanish sport